The Miss Russia 2005 pageant was held on December 1, 2005, at Gostiny Dvor Arcade. 60 women competed at the pageant where Alexandra Ivanovskaya won representing the Komsomolsk-on-Amur.

Placement

Contestants

External links
 Miss Russia Official Website

Miss Russia
2005 beauty pageants
2005 in Russia